Siamak "Matt" Ghaffari (born November 11, 1961, in Tehran, Imperial State of Iran) is an Iran-born American amateur wrestler, MMA Fighter and professional wrestler. Ghaffari was a two-time USA Olympic team member, obtaining a silver medal at the 1996 Atlanta Summer Olympic Games. Ghaffari finished his career with the most Greco-Roman World and Olympic medals by a United States wrestler.

Early life
Born in Tehran, Iran, Ghaffari came to the United States at a young age, he attended Paramus High School in Paramus, New Jersey.

Amateur wrestling career
Representing the United States at the 1992 Barcelona Summer Olympic Games and 1996 Atlanta Summer Olympic Games, Ghaffari reached the final of the heavyweight Men's Greco-Roman 130 kg division, where he lost 0–1 to Russian Aleksandr Karelin in overtime. Ghaffari was a seven-time United States wrestling champion and a two-time USA Olympic Committee Greco-Roman Athlete of the Year.

In 2013, Ghaffari was inducted in the National Wrestling Hall of Fame as a Distinguished Member.

Mixed martial arts career
In 2002, Ghaffari fought in the Tokyo Dome in front of 28,000 spectators at a mixed martial arts bout in UFO-  Universal Fighting-Arts Organization against judo Olympic Silver Medalist Naoya Ogawa. Ghaffari managed to take Ogawa down and attack him with a brief ground and pound, but back to standing, Ogawa landed a punch which shifted Matt's left eye contact lens and forced him to quit.

Mixed martial arts record

|-
| Loss
| align=center | 0–1
|  Naoya Ogawa
| TKO (punch)
| UFO Legend
| 
| align=center | 1
| align=center | 0:56
| Tokyo, Japan
|

Professional wrestling career

In 1996, Ghaffari was scouted by professional wrestling promotion World Championship Wrestling and was featured in several vignettes, but did not sign up with the company.

After his stint in MMA, Ghaffari started to work in the Japanese promotion Pro Wrestling ZERO-ONE, where he won the NWA Intercontinental Tag Team Championship with Tom Howard on December 15, 2002, by defeating Shinya Hashimoto and old opponent Naoya Ogawa. They held the championship until April 29, 2003, when they lost it to Hashimoto and Ogawa.

In 2004, Ghaffari made an apparition for HUSTLE, pinning Ogawa after a beatdown from the heel faction Monster Army (Mark Coleman, Kevin Randleman, Dusty Rhodes Jr., Giant Silva and Dan Bobish).

Championships and accomplishments
 Pro Wrestling ZERO-ONE
 NWA Intercontinental Tag Team Championship (1 time) – with Tom Howard
 ZERO-ONE O-300 Super Heavyweight Championship (1 time)

References

External links
 Official website

1961 births
Living people
Olympic competitors from Iran who represented other countries
Olympic silver medalists for the United States in wrestling
Paramus High School alumni
People from Paramus, New Jersey
Wrestlers at the 1992 Summer Olympics
Wrestlers at the 1996 Summer Olympics
Wrestlers from New Jersey
American male sport wrestlers
Iranian emigrants to the United States
Iranian male mixed martial artists
American male mixed martial artists
Mixed martial artists utilizing Greco-Roman wrestling
Mixed martial artists utilizing collegiate wrestling
American male professional wrestlers
Iranian professional wrestlers
World Wrestling Championships medalists
Medalists at the 1996 Summer Olympics
Pan American Games gold medalists for the United States
Pan American Games medalists in wrestling
Sportspeople of Iranian descent
Wrestlers at the 1991 Pan American Games
Wrestlers at the 1995 Pan American Games
Medalists at the 1991 Pan American Games
Medalists at the 1995 Pan American Games